The 1953 World Ninepin Bowling Classic Championships was the first edition of the championships and were held in Belgrade, Yugoslavia, from 21–24 June 1953. Germany sent a united team composed of players from the GDR and the FRG.

In the men's competition the title was won by Yugoslavia in the team competition and by Alfred Baierl (Austria) in the individual event. In the women's competition the title was won by Austria in the team competition and by Jelena Šincek (Yugoslavia) in the individual event.

Participating teams

Men 
 
 
 
 
  Saar

Women

Results

Men - team 

The competition was played with 200 throws mixed (100 full, 100 clean). Teams were composed of 6 competitors and the scores were added up.

|}

Women - team 

The competition was played with 100 throws mixed (50 full, 50 clean). Teams were composed of 6 competitors and the scores were added up.

|}

Men - individual

Women - individual

Medal summary

Medal table

Men

Women

Footnotes

References 
 WC 1953 on KZS
 WC History on WNBA NBC

World Ninepin Bowling Classic Championships
1953 in bowling
1953 in Yugoslav sport
International sports competitions hosted by Yugoslavia
International sports competitions in Belgrade
1953 in Serbia
June 1953 sports events in Europe